Vyshe-Talovka is a rural locality (a selo) in Maloareshevsky Selsoviet, Kizlyarsky District, Republic of Dagestan, Russia. The population was 784 as of 2010.

Geography 
Vyshe-Talovka is located 31 km north of Kizlyar (the district's administrative centre) by road. Kerlikent and Malaya Areshevka are the nearest rural localities.

Nationalities 
Avars, Dargins and Russians live there.

References 

Rural localities in Kizlyarsky District